Glendale is an unincorporated community in Saline County, Kansas, United States. It is the only community within the boundaries of the Glendale Township. There are no businesses or services located at Glendale.

Demographics
As a part of Saline County, Glendale is a part of the Salina micropolitan area.

Education
The community is served by Twin Valley USD 240 public school district.

References

Further reading

External links
 Saline County maps: Current, Historic, KDOT

Unincorporated communities in Saline County, Kansas
Salina, Kansas micropolitan area
Unincorporated communities in Kansas